Gastone is a masculine Italian given name. Notable people with the name include:

Gastone Baldi (1901–1971), Italian professional football player
Gastone Bean (born 1936), Italian former professional footballer who played as a striker
Gastone Bottini (born 1987), Italian professional footballer who plays as a midfielder
Gastone Brilli-Peri (1893–1930), Italian racing driver, won the 1925 Italian Grand Prix
Gastone Darè (1918–1976), Italian Olympic fencer
Gastone Gambara (1890–1962), Italian General during the Spanish Civil War and World War II
Gastone Moschin (1929–2017), Italian actor
Gastone Nencini (1930–1980), Italian road racing cyclist
Gastone Novelli (1895–1919), World War I flying ace credited with eight aerial victories
Gastone Pierini (1899–1967), Italian weightlifter
Gastone Prendato (1910–1980), Italian professional football player and coach
Gastone Ventura (1906–1981), Italian aristocrat
Gian Gastone de' Medici, Grand Duke of Tuscany (1671–1737), the seventh and last Medicean Grand Duke of Tuscany
 Gastone (Petrolini), Italian character created by Ettore Petrolini in his homonymous comedy

Italian masculine given names